Madina Ramdani (born 13 May 1991) is an Algerian footballer who plays as a forward for AS Sûreté Nationale and the Algeria women's national team.

Club career
Ramdani has played for Sûreté Nationale in Algeria.

International career
Ramdani competed for Algeria at the 2018 Africa Women Cup of Nations, playing in two matches.

References

1991 births
Living people
Footballers from Algiers
Algerian women's footballers
Women's association football forwards
Algeria women's international footballers
21st-century Algerian people